The 2021–22 season was the 97th season in the existence of FC Lokomotiv Moscow and the club's 26th consecutive season in the top flight of Russian football. In addition to the domestic league, Lokomotiv Moscow participated in this season's editions of the Russian Cup, the Russian Super Cup and the UEFA Europa League.

Players

First-team squad

Out on loan

Transfers

In

Out

Pre-season and friendlies

Competitions

Overall record

Premier League

League table

Results summary

Results by round

Matches

Russian Cup

Russian Super Cup

UEFA Europa League

Group stage

The draw for the group stage was held on 27 August 2021.

Squad statistics

Goal scorers

References

FC Lokomotiv Moscow seasons
Lokomotiv Moscow
2021–22 UEFA Europa League participants seasons